The 1975–76 Scottish Second Division was won by Clydebank who, along with second placed Raith Rovers, were promoted to the First Division. Meadowbank Thistle finished bottom.

Table

References 

Scottish Second Division seasons
3
Scot